Mark D. Smith (born January 5, 1952) is an American politician who has served as a member of the Iowa House of Representatives since 2001.

Early life and education 
Smith was born and raised in Osceola, Iowa. He earned a Bachelor of Science from Graceland College and a Master of Social Work from the University of Iowa.

Career 
Smith works on the Substance Abuse Treatment Unit of Central Iowa and as an adjunct instructor of social work at the University of Iowa.

Smith serves on the Commission on Tobacco User Prevention and Control and on the Iowa Comprehensive Health Insurance Board. Prior to serving in the Iowa House of Representatives, Smith served on the Osceola City Council from 1981 to 1983.

On September 22, 2019, Smith announced that he would not seek re-election in 2020 and will retire after 20 years of service.

On February 15, 2020, Smith was elected chair of the Iowa Democratic Party.

References

External links

Representative Mark Smith official Iowa General Assembly site
Mark Smith Iowa House official constituency site
 

|-

|-

|-

1952 births
21st-century American politicians
American Disciples of Christ
Graceland University alumni
Iowa city council members
Living people
Democratic Party members of the Iowa House of Representatives
People from Osceola, Iowa
Politicians from Marshalltown, Iowa
State political party chairs of Iowa
University of Iowa alumni
University of Iowa faculty